Setayeshoonops is a genus of spiders in the family Oonopidae. It was first described in 2011 by Makhan & Ezzatpanah. , it contains only one species, Setayeshoonops setayeshoonops, found in Suriname.

References

Oonopidae
Monotypic Araneomorphae genera
Spiders of South America